Ogi is a village located in Angul district, in the Indian state of Odisha. 
 The Village Ogi which is often called Ogi-Para because of its close proximity to Para village is well known from the British colonial era. Notable People including Pabitra Mohan Pradhan, Sarangadhar Das, and Mahatma Gandhi had also visited to the Ogi village in its history.

The village Ogi is surrounded by green belt with high rising mountains and famous for its traditional Odia culture with festivities throughout the year. Despite being a typical Odissan village, Ogi still boosts of her rich religious customs associated with Budha Thakura traditions believed to have started centuries ago. It is said that there was a leisure palace of the last Khonds or Kandha chieftain called Anu Kandha in Ogi and the area was a constant point of watch by the British government because the tribal chieftain was the only one who did not succumb to the alien power in the region.

The village is 28 km from the district headquarters Angul and is accessible by surface transport. Till 2018, National Highway 42 was two kilometers away from the village merging at two places namely at Jarapada and Kanjara. But Now, Highways constructed and become the National Highway 55 at Jarapada and Kanjara two kilometers away from Ogi. The nearest railway station Jarapada is about two and half kilometers away. There is regular private and public bus services available from Ogi to the district headquarters. Some of the adjacent villages connecting to Ogi are Para, Jarapada, Tukuda, Kanjara, Durgapur and Antulia.

The village institutions in Ogi include a post office, a primary school, a high school, a Grama panchayat Office, an ANM Center. There are few minor irrigation projects in the village irrigation especially during summer season. The area is covered by several Indian cellular services such as Airtel, Aircel, BSNL, Vodafone and Idea Cellular, Jio.

Geography 

Ogi is surrounded mostly by forests, farmlands and hills. It is situated almost in the middle of the district of Angul. The road diverting from Kanjara passes through Ogi all the way to the famous Crocodile Sanctuary at Tikarapada. The same road also connects to other villages like Tainsi and Jagannthapur located at the interior side of Antualia forest. Besides, it is also possible to reach famous hot water spring located at Deulajhari by passing through Ogi via Paikasahi.

Demographics 
The population of Ogi proper is about two thousand five hundred. However Ogi Gram panchayat as a whole has about five thousand population. According to the Odisha state Chief Electoral Office sources, Ogi village has a male population of 1151 and female population of 1124 making the total count to 2275.

Education 
There is one Upper Primary School, one High School, one Primary school situated in the village. Recently, a Senior Secondary School (+2) has been approved by the government of Odisha for the village.  The nearest college to the village is Patitapabana Mahavidyalaya in Jarapada, although pupils from the village also commute to Government Autonomous College, Angul and Janata College, Boinda for higher studies.

Culture 
There is a famous saying among the Odias, that "Odias have 13 festivals in 12 months". This is typical of most of the villages in Odisha and Ogi is no exception to this. Major festivals in the village include Dusshera, Kartik Poornima, Shivaratri. However Ogi is most famous in the Angul district for its annual Dola Purnima/Phalguna Yatra or Agara Jatra as popularly known. Other Odia religious festivals like Pana Sankranti, Hanuman Jayanti, Akshaya Tritiya, Raja Parba, Raksha Bandhan, Khudurukuni Osha, Ganesha Puja/Vinayaka Chaturthi, Garvana Sankranti, Kumara Purnima, Deepavali, Prathamastami, Manabasa/Mahalaxmi Gurubara, Pausa Purnima, Makara Sankranti, Saraswati Puja and Holi are observed ordinarily and serially according to the Odia Calendar that follows the regular Hindu calendar.

Food
Typical Oriya foods include rice, tomatoes, potatoes, dal like mung, peanuts, vegetables similar to yam, bitter gourd (called Momordica charantia), Dillenia Speciosa, pumpkin, white gourd (winter melon), red gourd, spinach and sweet potato, Trichosanthes cucumerina, Luffa, okra, cauliflowers, cabbages, eggplants and arum can all be found in any Oriya family's backyard.

One dish, Pakhala, made from a mix of boiled rice and water, is eaten with boiled potatoes mixed with green chili pepper, curd, salt, and onions. Biri chaula chakuli pitha consisting of Vigna mungo and rice. It is normally eaten for breakfast. Chakuli pitha can be eaten with Santula or Dalma. Pitha and is the main sweet dish at every festival they celebrate. There are different types of pitha made out of rice, namely Aarisa pitha, Manda Pitha, Kakara Pitha, Enduri Pitha, Chakuli Pitha, Poda Pitha, Chitau Pitha, Tala Pitha and much more.

Ogi Cuisine

Alu Potala Rasa, Bela Pana, Chadachadi, Chakuli pitha, Chandrakanti, Chhena, Chhena gaja, Chhena jalebi, Chhena Jhili, Chhena kheeri, Chhena poda, Chhencheda, Chingudi Jhola, Dahi baigana, Dahi machha, Enduri Pitha, Gajar ka halwa, Ghugni, Handia (drink), Ilish, Kakara pitha, Khaja, Kheer, Khichdi, Khira sagara, Khiramohana, Kora Khai, Luchi, Fish, Bihana, Machher Jhol, Manda pitha, Mathapuli, Mishti doi, Ouu khatta, Pakhala, Pitha, Podo pitha, Rasabali, Saag, Samosa, Santula, Sattu, Baigan Bharta are a few of the many varieties of culinary specialties to be found in Ogi.

Sports
There is a cricket ground near High School in the village where children can play cricket and other types of games, such as marbles, Kabaddi, and Gilli-danda, Volleyball. The people of Ogi also organize cricket tournaments every year to promote the sport and for both players and spectators to enjoy.

Health 
The lack of a permanent site for an Auxiliary nurse midwife center resulted in an overall low level of health of the villagers. Ogi is a panchayat but not medical facility. The nearby Primary hospital are present in Jarapada which is at least 5 km-6 km from the Village. Every Year, the Blood Donation Camp held at Ogi by Government for the Blood donors from Village.

Economy 
Agriculture is the main livelihood of the village populace and the major population living in the village belongs to CHASA community, whose traditional occupation is farming. However marginal land holding and lack of proper irrigation facilities with heavy dependency on rain water for farming often causes great hardship for the farmers. There are other occupational groups such as black smith, oil producers, gold smith, traders, and priestly class living together in the village as a single unit. In recent years, due to industrialization of Odisha, a large number of youths are leaving farming occupation and getting engaged in other industrial activities.

References

Cities and towns in Angul district
Villages in Angul district